Brenda Allen (aka Marie Mitchell) was a madam based in Los Angeles, California, whose arrest in 1948 triggered a scandal that led to the attempted reform of the Los Angeles Police Department (L.A.P.D.). Allen received police protection due to her relationship with Sergeant Elmer V. Jackson of the L.A.P.D.'s administrative vice squad, who reportedly was her lover.

Early career
Allen began as a prostitute in Los Angeles in the 1930s, though she already had several prior morals charges in other US cities. She rose to prominence around 1940 as the successor to Ann Forrester (aka "Black Widow"), who had previously run a $5,000-a-week prostitution syndicate but was convicted and sentenced to prison.

Scandal
After an attempted robbery of Brenda Allen and Sergeant Jackson in which Jackson shot and killed the perpetrator, the press and other members of the police became aware of their relationship. Wiretaps led to the arrest of Allen and the resulting publicity to the convening of a grand jury.

The publicity from the grand jury revelations of police corruption led to the resignation of L.A.P.D. Chief Clemence B. Horrall and his replacement by retired Marine Major General William A. Worton, who had served with the Marine Corps' III Amphibious Corps at the Battle of Okinawa.

Reform

Worton was appointed by L.A. mayor Fletcher Bowron on a temporary basis. He served from July 1949 to August 1950, when he was replaced as chief by William H. Parker, who had served the general as a special aide and then as head of Internal Affairs (Horrall's deputy chief, Joe Reed, also resigned after being shamed by grand jury testimony.) It was Parker, in his 16-year reign as police chief, who is credited with cleaning up the L.A.P.D.

Cultural impact
The relationship between Allen and Jackson was depicted in author John Gregory Dunne's 1977 novel True Confessions, which was later turned into a movie starring Robert de Niro and Robert Duvall (as Jackson).

Brenda Allen was played by Joan Van Ark in the CBS made-for-television film Shakedown on the Sunset Strip (1988).

The story of Brenda Allen also plays a role in the 2011 video game L.A. Noire. In an attempt to divert media attention from Allen's arrest and protect themselves, the corrupt police chief and other public officials expose an affair between German singer Elsa Lichtman and the game's protagonist, Cole Phelps, resulting in him being demoted and disgraced.

The scandal appears in the James Ellroy novels The Black Dahlia, The Big Nowhere, Perfidia and This Storm, and is mentioned extensively in the book LAPD '53 for which Ellroy provided text to photographs provided by the Los Angeles Police Museum.

See also the cast at "Farewell, My Lovely (1975 film)".

See also
 History of the Los Angeles Police Department

References

Further reading

Articles
 Staff (August 26, 1948). "Judge Lashes 'Immunity'; Sentences Allen Again", Los Angeles Times.
 Staff (May 17, 1949). "Brenda Allen Quits Battle, Begins Term", Los Angeles Evening Citizen News.
 St. Johns, Elaine (July 7, 1949). "Vice Queen Just Frumpy Old Girl; Brenda in Jail; Brenda in Jail Aged, Drab; Won't Talk of Money Cache". pp. 4, 16.  
 Staff (July 18, 1949).  "Vice Scandal Reveals a 'Leading Woman'". Life.
 Murphy, Annie (June 14, 2018). "Seduction, Corruption, Deception, and Protection – The Black Widow and the Vice Queen (Part 2)". Los Angeles Public Library.

Books

External Links
Brenda Allen, Madame, Prostitute Par Excellence. theWanderling.com

1910s births
American brothel owners and madams
American prostitutes
Criminals from Los Angeles
20th-century criminals
Year of birth missing
Year of death missing
History of women in California